The Kiski Area School District is a large, suburban/rural public school district located in Westmoreland County Pennsylvania.

Municipalities
The school district serves
 Allegheny Township
 Avonmore Borough
 Bell Township
 East Vandergrift Borough
 Hyde Park Borough
 Oklahoma Borough
 Vandergrift Borough
 Washington Township
 Parks Township

Schools
There are currently three primary elementary schools (grades K–4), an upper elementary school (grades 5–6), an intermediate school (grades 7–8), and a high school (grades 9–12) within the district.

Elementary schools (grades K–4)

Upper Elementary (grades 5–6)

Intermediate school (grades 7–8)

High school (grades 9–12)

Budgeting
Kiski Area School District's 2019–2020 budget is $62,104,250.

See also
List of school districts in Pennsylvania

References

External links
 
 
 Kiski Area School District Veterans Website

School districts established in 1958
School districts in Westmoreland County, Pennsylvania
School districts in Armstrong County, Pennsylvania
Education in Pittsburgh area
1958 establishments in Pennsylvania